Greenbrae is a small unincorporated community  in Marin County, California. Part of Greenbrae is an unincorporated community of the county while the remaining area is inside the city limits of Larkspur. The ZIP code is 94904, and is shared with the neighboring Census-designated place (CDP) of Kentfield. The community is in area codes 415 and 628.

About 
Predominantly composed of hillside and waterfront terrain, its homes and offices are known for their views of the San Francisco Bay, Corte Madera Creek, and Mount Tamalpais. "Brae" means a steep bank or hillside in dialects of Scotland and Northern Ireland; Greenbrae translates to "green hillside."

Greenbrae's neighborhoods are bordered by downtown Larkspur to the south, Larkspur Landing to the east, the unincorporated area of Kentfield to the west, and the city of San Rafael to the north. Straddling Sir Francis Drake Boulevard, its most frequented points of interest include Marin General Hospital and Bon Air Shopping Center.

It is in the Tamalpais Union High School District.

History 
The developer of Greenbrae was Schultz Building Company, which included Niels Schultz and his son Niels Schultz, Jr. In 1946, the area of land was originally 635 acres of farmland and was purchased for development by the Archdiocese of San Francisco. Schultz built more than 1,000 homes, 1,500 apartments and dozens of businesses. When designing the neighborhood they focused on saving the local oak trees, design, housing setbacks, landscaped medians, and open areas.

Many years ago Larkspur annexed Greenbrae, as a result Greenbrae is sometimes referred to as a neighborhood within Larkspur.

Politics

Climate 
This region experiences warm (but not hot) and dry summers, with no average monthly temperatures above 71.6 °F.  According to the Köppen Climate Classification system, Greenbrae has a warm-summer Mediterranean climate, abbreviated "Csb" on climate maps.

Notable residents

Artists 

 Larry Sultan (1946–2009), photographer.

Entertainment 

 Les Crane (1933–2008), radio announcer and television talk show host.
 Michael Krasny (born 1944), radio host.

Politicians and civil service 

 Barbara Boxer (born 1940), member of the United States Senate, she lived in Greenbrae until 2006.
 S. I. Hayakawa (1906–1992), member of the United States Senate and president of San Francisco State University.
 Gavin Newsom (born 1967), 40th Governor of California.

Sports 
Buddy Biancalana (born 1960), baseball player, was born in Greenbrae.
 Pete Carroll (born 1951), football coach raised in Greenbrae.
 Wilt Chamberlain (1936–1999), basketball and volleyball player.
 Chad Kreuter(born 1964), baseball player, born in Greenbrae.
 Will Venable (born 1982), baseball player, born in Greenbrae.

Writers 

 Jack Finney (1911–1995), writer who died in Greenbrae shortly after completing his last novel.

Others 

 William Silverman (1917–2004), pediatrician who influenced the development of the neonatal intensive care unit.

In popular culture
Director Don Siegal filmed the final scenes from the 1971 movie Dirty Harry on East Sir Francis Drake Boulevard. After hijacking a school bus, "Scorpio" (Andy Robinson) drives into East Sir Francis Drake Boulevard at the Greenbrae interchange.

See also
 List of people from Marin County, California

References

External links
 Marin General Hospital

Unincorporated communities in California
Unincorporated communities in Marin County, California